Parastenella is a genus of cnidarians belonging to the family Primnoidae.

The species of this genus are found in Pacific Ocean.

Species:

Parastenella atlantica 
Parastenella bayeri 
Parastenella doederleini 
Parastenella gymnogaster 
Parastenella pacifica 
Parastenella pomponiae 
Parastenella ramosa 
Parastenella spinosa

References

Primnoidae
Octocorallia genera